The 1966–67 season was the 58th year of football played by Dundee United, and covers the period from 1 July 1966 to 30 June 1967. United finished in ninth place in the First Division.

Match results
Dundee United played a total of 48 competitive matches during the 1966–67 season.

Legend

All results are written with Dundee United's score first.
Own goals in italics

First Division

Scottish Cup

League Cup

Inter-Cities Fairs Cup

References

See also
 1966–67 in Scottish football

Dundee United F.C. seasons
Dundee United